Fabijan Komljenović (born 16 January 1968) is a Croatian retired football player.

Playing career

Club
While playing for Rijeka, he was nicknamed the Caniggia from Kantrida due to his style of play and physical appearance.

International
He made his international debut against Slovenia at Murska Sobota on 19 June 1991, where he scored the winning goal (0–1). This was his single appearance for the Croatia national football team. It was unofficial however, since Croatia was still part of Yugoslavia at the time.

Coaching career
Komljenović retired at the end of 2000 and began his coaching career at Davor Šuker's Soccer Academy.

Career statistics
Sources:

References

External links
 
 
 
 

1968 births
Living people
Footballers from Zagreb
Association football midfielders
Yugoslav footballers
Croatian footballers
Croatia international footballers
GNK Dinamo Zagreb players
HNK Rijeka players
NK Zagreb players
NK Istra players
FC Schalke 04 players
K.R.C. Genk players
K.R.C. Zuid-West-Vlaanderen players
NK Hrvatski Dragovoljac players
NK Marsonia players
Pohang Steelers players
Yugoslav First League players
Croatian Football League players
Bundesliga players
First Football League (Croatia) players
Challenger Pro League players
Belgian Pro League players
K League 1 players
Croatian expatriate footballers
Expatriate footballers in Germany
Croatian expatriate sportspeople in Germany
Expatriate footballers in Belgium
Croatian expatriate sportspeople in Belgium
Expatriate footballers in South Korea
Croatian expatriate sportspeople in South Korea
Croatian football managers
GNK Dinamo Zagreb non-playing staff
Croatian expatriate sportspeople in Slovenia
Croatian expatriate sportspeople in Austria
Croatian expatriate sportspeople in Iran